The 2019 Riga Masters (also known as the 2019 Kaspersky Riga Masters due to sponsorship) was a professional ranking snooker tournament held from 26 to 28 July 2019 at the Arēna Rīga in Riga, Latvia. It was the sixth Riga Masters event, with the first being held in 2013, and the first ranking event of the 2019/2020 snooker season. The defending champion, Neil Robertson, previously defeated Jack Lisowski in the 2018 final. However, Robertson and several other players were forced to withdraw from qualifying round matches due to flight cancellations, and therefore could not compete in the event.

Yan Bingtao defeated Mark Joyce 5–2 in the final, winning the event and earning his first career ranking title. Yan became the first teenager to win a ranking event in 13 years since Ding Junhui won the 2006 Northern Ireland Trophy aged 19. No players from the top 20 in the world reached the quarter-finals. Lisowski scored the highest break of the tournament, a 145. The event had a total prize fund of £278,000 with the winner receiving £50,000. Qualifying for the event was held between 10 and 13 June 2019 at the Ponds Forge International Sports Centre in Sheffield, England.

Format
The tournament was played from 26 to 28 July 2019 at the Arēna Rīga in Riga, Latvia. The event was organised by the World Professional Billiards and Snooker Association, and sponsored by Kaspersky Lab. Matches were played as best-of-seven  until the semi-finals, which were best-of-nine frames.  The quarter-finals, semi-finals, and final were all played on 28 July. The event was broadcast on Eurosport Player (Pan-Europe); NowTV (Hong Kong); Truesport Thailand; and Superstars Online, Youku, and Zhibo.tv (China).

Prize fund
The prize fund was slightly increased from the 2018 event. The champion still received £50,000, but the total prize fund increased from £259,000 to £278,000, as follows:

 Winner: £50,000
 Runner-up: £25,000
 Semi-final: £15,000
 Quarter-final: £6,000
 Last 16: £4,000
 Last 32: £3,000
 Last 64: £2,000
 Highest break: £5,000
 Total: £278,000

Tournament summary

Early rounds

The round-of-64 began on 26 July 2019 in Riga, Latvia. Due to flight complications, many players missed the event and had to withdraw, including two-time and defending champion Neil Robertson, Kyren Wilson, and Joe O'Connor. World Snooker commented that due to the number of players missing their matches, it would be difficult to reschedule the affected matches. The held-over qualifying match between Robertson and Robert Milkins was not held as both players were unable to compete in the event, which gave Ben Woollaston a bye into the last 32. Milkins and Robertson made Twitter comments on their encounter, as penalty frames were awarded to each player for not appearing in the match.

Three-time world champion Mark Williams defeated James Cahill 4–3, but Williams did not realise he could score a century break, after turning down the final . Mark Selby received two byes before facing Graeme Dott in the second round. Dott won the first three frames of the match, but Selby won the final four to progress. In the round of 16, Selby lost to Stuart Carrington. The 2018 runner-up Jack Lisowski reached the round of 16, before losing to Mark Joyce.

Quarter-finals 
After the round-of-16, no player qualifying for the quarter-finals was ranked in the top 20 in the world. With a ranking of 21, Yan Bingtao was the highest ranked player in the quarter-finals. The quarter-finals, semi-finals, and finals were all played on 28 July. In the quarter-finals, Joyce, who was world rank 54, defeated Carrington 4–1 to advance to the semi-finals, marking his best performance in a ranking event. After defeating Lyu Haotian and Thepchaiya  in previous rounds, Kurt Maflin defeated Luo Honghao 4–1, reaching his third career semi-final. Matthew Selt defeated Mark King 4–1 to reach the semi-final. Selt was the only remaining player who had previously won a ranking event (the 2019 Indian Open). Yan defeated Li Hang 4–3 to reach the semi-finals for the first time since the 2017 Northern Ireland Open.

Semi-finals
In the first semi-final, Joyce and Maflin exchanged frames throughout the match, with each player alternately winning each frame to tie at 4–4. In the second semi-final, Yan defeated Selt 5–3. Neither player made a century break. However, Yan scored a match-high break of 88 to win.

Final
The final between Yan and Joyce was played at 9 p.m. EEST (UTC+3) and refereed by Tatiana Woollaston. It was Joyce's first final, and neither player had previously won a ranking event. In the first frame, Yan required a snooker and  the cue ball behind the black, forcing Joyce to hit the blue ball instead of the brown, awarding Yan enough penalty points to be able to win the frame. Yan  to win the first frame. Yan won the second frame to lead 2–0, but Joyce won the third with a century break. Yan won three of the next four frames, with breaks of higher than 50. He defeated Joyce 5–2, winning the event and earning his first career ranking title. Yan became the first player born after 2000 to win a ranking event, as well as the first teenager to win a ranking event in 13 years since Ding Junhui won the 2006 Northern Ireland Trophy at age 19.

Main draw
The main draw for the tournament featured 64 players. Certain players had to withdraw from the competition due to flight difficulties, and are denoted below with a bye to their opponent. A w/d indicates a withdrawn player, whilst a w/o indicates a walkover. Players listed in bold denote match winners.

Final

Qualifying
Qualifying matches were held between 10 and 13 June 2019 at the Ponds Forge International Sports Centre in Sheffield, England. Matches involving Neil Robertson, Kishan Hirani, Mark Selby, Duane Jones, and Mark Williams, were planned to be played in Riga. All matches were best-of-seven frames.

Century breaks

Televised stage centuries
A total of 19 centuries were made during the event. Jack Lisowski scored a 145, the highest break of the event. Mark Williams made his break of 137 in a held over match.

 145, 140, 119  Jack Lisowski
 143  Graeme Dott
 137  Liam Highfield
 137  Mark Williams
 127  Daniel Wells
 126, 112, 109, 103  Mark Joyce
 120  Mei Xiwen
 112  Kurt Maflin
 110  Gary Wilson
 109, 104  Tom Ford
 106  Ricky Walden
 106  Rod Lawler
 101  Yan Bingtao

Qualifying stage centuries
During the pre-tournament qualification, 23 centuries were made. Dominic Dale scores the highest of these, with a break of 141.

 141  Dominic Dale
 138  Lu Ning
 136  Yuan Sijun
 132, 112  Thepchaiya Un-Nooh
 131  David Grace
 131  Oliver Lines
 131  Ricky Walden
 129  Anthony Hamilton
 128, 109  Alan McManus
 125  Michael Holt
 124  Scott Donaldson
 120, 101  Jamie O'Neill
 119  Mei Xiwen
 112  Jackson Page
 112  Qingtian Yang
 109  Chris Wakelin
 109  Riley Parsons
 105  Kurt Maflin
 103  Joe O'Connor
 101  Ian Burns

References

2019
Riga Masters (snooker)
Riga Masters (snooker)
Riga Masters